At War With Plastic is the debut LP album by The Revolution Smile, self-released by the band in 2001.

Track listing 
 Payday
 The New Diet
 Come Together
 Plasticman
 One Percent
 Orange

References 

The Revolution Smile albums
2001 albums